Thitena is a genus of beach flies, insects in the family Canacidae (formally Tethinidae). All known species are Australasian in distribution.

Species
T. cadaverina Munari, 2004

References

Canacidae
Carnoidea genera